Mormo venata is a moth of the family Noctuidae. It is found in the western parts of China.

References 

Hadeninae
Moths described in 1908
Insects of Japan